The 33rd Annual Nickelodeon Kids' Choice Awards ceremony (officially titled "Nickelodeon's Kids' Choice Awards 2020: Celebrate Together") was held virtually on May 2, 2020, with Victoria Justice serving as host. It aired on Nickelodeon and in a domestic simulcast with several other ViacomCBS cable networks, and also aired across all of Nickelodeon's international networks.

The ceremony was held virtually due to the ongoing COVID-19 pandemic, and it was also the smallest-scale ceremony since 1987, when the first ceremony (titled The Big Ballot) aired as part of the existing series Rated K: For Kids by Kids. The ceremony was made up of pre-recorded award acceptances after voting, a performance from Asher Angel, and the first slime in space, inside the International Space Station. In addition, Nickelodeon presented a $1 million donation to No Kid Hungry in support of children and families affected by the pandemic.

In its originally planned form, the ceremony was to have been held at The Forum in Inglewood, California. Chance the Rapper was originally set to host, with Justin Bieber and Quavo performing their song "Intentions" (which they would later perform in the following year's ceremony). The ceremony was also originally scheduled to coincide with Nickelodeon's SlimeFest weekend of March 21–22, airing on March 22, which would have been the first time the ceremony had aired on a Sunday instead of its traditional Saturday night berth. On March 7, the outdoor aspects of SlimeFest were postponed to a future date due to public health concerns regarding the COVID-19 pandemic, before the network cancelled the event as a whole. The ceremony itself was postponed four days after the SlimeFest postponement. The original timeslot of the ceremony instead contained a "best-of" compilation special.

A rerun of an episode of Danger Force led into the ceremony, while a rerun of an episode of Tyler Perry's Young Dylan served as the lead-out. The series finale of Henry Danger, "The Fate of Danger: Part II", was originally set to serve as the lead-in for the ceremony on March 22. Following the postponement of the ceremony, the Henry Danger finale instead aired on March 21 along with a new episode of Tyler Perry's Young Dylan and a new episode of All That.

Appearances 
The following actors, singers, and social media personalities all appeared via remote videotelephony during the ceremony:

 Dwayne Johnson
 Shawn Mendes
 Camila Cabello
 Dove Cameron
 Kristen Bell
 Josh Gad
 Millie Bobby Brown
 The cast members of Stranger Things
 Millie Bobby Brown
 Finn Wolfhard
 Caleb McLaughlin
 Sadie Sink
 Noah Schnapp
 Simon Cowell
 Lil Nas X
 Ellen DeGeneres
 JoJo Siwa
 David Dobrik
 Billie Eilish
 LeBron James
 BTS
 SSSniperwolf
 Bill Fagerbakke
 Tom Kenny
 Jace Norman
 The cast members of Henry Danger
 Michael D. Cohen
 Jace Norman
 Cooper Barnes
 Ella Anderson
 Sean Ryan Fox
 Riele Downs
 Annie LeBlanc
 Ariana Grande
 ESA Astronaut Col. Luca Parmitano
 NASA Astronaut Christina Koch
 The cast members of Avengers: Endgame
 Scarlett Johansson
 Mark Ruffalo
 Jeremy Renner
 Chris Hemsworth
 Chris Evans
 Robert Downey Jr.
 Madison Reed (was slimed with her half-sister Victoria Justice)

In addition, Asher Angel performed "All Day" during the ceremony.

Winners and nominees 
The nominees were announced and voting opened on February 13, 2020. Voting ended on March 22, 2020. The winners are listed first, highlighted in boldfaced text.

Movies

Television

Music

Sports

Miscellaneous

Special Recognition

Generation Change 
 LeBron James

International 
The following are nominations for awards to be given by Nickelodeon's international networks.

References

External links 
  (archived)
 

Nickelodeon Kids' Choice Awards
Kids' Choice
Kids' Choice Awards
Kids' Choice Awards
Kids' Choice Awards
Kids' Choice Awards
Kids' Choice Awards 2020
Kids' Choice Awards 2020